Odintsovka is a rural locality (a selo) in Biysk, Altai Krai, Russia. The population was 401 as of 2013. There are 8 streets.

Geography 
Odintsovka is located 27 km southwest of Biysk (the district's administrative centre) by road. Fominskoye is the nearest rural locality.

References 

Rural localities in Biysk Urban Okrug
Populated places on the Ob River